is a passenger railway station located in the city of Fuchū, Tokyo, Japan, operated by the private railway operator Seibu Railway.

Lines

Station layout
The station has a single side platform serving a single-directional track.

Platforms

History
The station opened on June 20, 1922.

Station numbering was introduced on all Seibu Railway lines during fiscal 2012, with Koremasa Station becoming "SW06".

Passenger statistics
In fiscal 2019, the station was the 72rd busiest on the Seibu network with an average of 7,838 passengers daily. 

The passenger figures for previous years are as shown below.

Surrounding area
Tama River

See also
 List of railway stations in Japan

References

External links

 Koremasa Station information (Seibu Railway) 

Railway stations in Japan opened in 1922
Railway stations in Tokyo
Seibu Tamagawa Line
Fuchū, Tokyo